Lunga Ncube is a South African rugby union player for the  in the Currie Cup. His regular position is lock.

Ncube was named in the  squad for the 2021 Currie Cup Premier Division.

References

South African rugby union players
Living people
Rugby union locks
Golden Lions players
2000 births
Sharks (Currie Cup) players
Lions (United Rugby Championship) players
Rugby union players from Durban